Igor Gočanin (July 24, 1966) is a Yugoslav water polo player. He was part of the Yugoslavia team which won the gold medal in water polo in the 1988 Summer Olympics.

See also
 Yugoslavia men's Olympic water polo team records and statistics
 List of Olympic champions in men's water polo
 List of Olympic medalists in water polo (men)

References

External links
 

1966 births
Living people
People from Herceg Novi
Serbs of Montenegro
Montenegrin male water polo players
Yugoslav male water polo players
Olympic water polo players of Yugoslavia
Olympic gold medalists for Yugoslavia
Water polo players at the 1988 Summer Olympics
Water polo coaches
Olympic medalists in water polo
Medalists at the 1988 Summer Olympics